Abdelmahmood Abdelhaleem Mohamad is a Sudanese diplomat. Since September 2006, Abdelhaleem has been his country's ambassador to the United Nations.

Career 
Abdelhaleem began his career in the Sudanese Foreign Ministry in 1975 after receiving his Bachelor of Science degree in political science from the University of Khartoum. In 1978, he received a master's degree in international relations from Ohio University. He has served across Africa and the Greater Middle East for Sudan, including Saudi Arabia (1987–1989), Ethiopia (1990–1995), Somalia (1994) and Afghanistan (2003).

On Darfur 
In an interview in a report on the conflict in Darfur by PBS's Frontline, he said, "We are a developing country, we have our shortcomings. But we are unfairly treated. The issue of Darfur has been blown out of proportion."

External links 
 Biography UN.org
PBS Frontline program On Our Watch

Year of birth missing (living people)
Living people
University of Khartoum alumni
Ohio University alumni
Permanent Representatives of Sudan to the United Nations
Sudanese diplomats